(born August 10, 1999) is a Japanese racing driver currently competing in Super Formula for Kuo Vantelin Team TOM'S and Super GT for TGR Team WedsSport Bandoh. He is a 2 time Japanese F4 champion and the 2020 Super Formula Lights champion.

Early and personal life
Miyata is a graduate of Yokohama High School. His name comes from the Fiat Ritmo, named as such by his parents as they were car enthusiasts. He was diagnosed with autism early in his childhood and was unable to adjust to school life during his kindergarten and elementary schooling years, spending much of his early life receiving counseling at various hospitals; he uses racing as a method of subduing his symptoms.

Miyata is an avid gamer, bringing his computer and consoles to races.

Career
Miyata started his motorsport career in karting in 2004, in which he remained active until 2015. That same year, he made his formula racing debut in the Japanese Formula 4 Championship with the RSS team at the last three race weekends of the season. Despite his limited experience, he finished in the top 10 in three of the six races, including a podium finish at Autopolis. He finished 15th in the standings with 24 points. In 2016 he drove a full season in Japanese Formula 4 with the team TOM'S Spirit. He won two races at Fuji Speedway and took podium finishes in three other races, making him the class champion with 142 points.

In 2017, Miyata raced a dual program in Japanese Formula 4 and Japanese Formula 3, driving in both series with TOM's. In Formula 4, he won four races at Fuji (twice), the Suzuka International Racing Course and the Twin Ring Motegi, and took the podium in seven other races. With 231 points he became champion in this class for the second time. In Formula 3 he achieved ten podium finishes, but did not win any races. Despite this, he finished fourth in the championship with 79 points, behind Mitsunori Takaboshi, Sho Tsuboi and Álex Palou. At the end of the year he raced with TOM'S in the Macau Grand Prix, finishing twelfth.

In 2018, Miyata remained active in Japanese Formula 3 with TOM's and also made his debut in the GT300 class of the Super GT with the team LM Corsa in a Lexus RC F GT3, where he shared the car with Hiroki Yoshimoto. In Formula 3, he won two races at Fuji and the Okayama International Circuit and took podium finishes in thirteen other races. That put him in second place with 117 points, behind Sho Tsuboi, who won all other races. In the Super GT, he took a podium finish at the Chang International Circuit and finished 15th in the championship with 23 points. At the end of the year he finished thirteenth for TOM's in the Macau Grand Prix.

In 2019, Miyata won eight races in Japanese Formula 3 and took seven other podium finishes, but still finished second behind Sacha Fenestraz with 142 points. In the Super GT, he won his first GT300 class race at Autopolis and finished twelfth in the standings with 25 points. He also made his GT500 class debut with the Lexus Team au Tom's in a Lexus LC 500 GT500 at the Fuji race, replacing Kazuki Nakajima, who was then competing in the FIA World Endurance Championship. He shared the car with Yuhi Sekiguchi, but failed to finish the race. At the end of the year, he made his World Touring Car Cup debut at Suzuka with Audi Sport Team Hitotsuyama in an Audi RS 3 LMS TCR as a guest driver. In two of the three races he failed to finish and in the third race he finished in 25th place.

In 2020, Japanese Formula 3 changed its name to the Super Formula Lights, in which Miyata continued to drive for TOM'S. He won twelve races and was on the podium in four of the remaining five races, making him a convincing champion with 153 points. He also made his Super Formula debut that year with TOM's at the Okayama and Autopolis races as a replacement for Kazuki Nakajima when the latter had commitments in the World Endurance Championship. He finished the races in ninth and eighth, taking seventeenth in the standings with 7 points. In the Super GT, he also made his full-time debut in the GT500 class with the TGR Team WedsSport Bandoh in a Toyota GR Supra GT500, sharing the car with Yuji Kunimoto. With a seventh place at Fuji as the best finish, the duo finished seventeenth in the championship with 10 points.

In 2021 Miyata made his debut as a full-time driver in Super Formula with Vantelin Team TOM'S and remained active in Super GT with TGR Team WedsSport Bandoh in a Toyota GR Supra GT500 alongside Kunimoto.

Racing record

Racing career summary 

† As Miyata was a guest driver, he was ineligible to score points.
‡ Team standings.

Complete Super GT results

Complete Super Formula Lights results 
(key) (Races in bold indicate pole position) (Races in italics indicate fastest lap)

Complete Super Formula results
(key) (Races in bold indicate pole position) (Races in italics indicate fastest lap)

‡ Half points awarded as less than 75% of race distance was completed.

References

External links
 

1999 births
Living people
Sportspeople from Kanagawa Prefecture
Japanese racing drivers
Super GT drivers
Super Formula drivers
Sportspeople with autism
Japanese Formula 3 Championship drivers
World Touring Car Cup drivers
TOM'S drivers
Toyota Gazoo Racing drivers
Karting World Championship drivers
Audi Sport drivers
Japanese F4 Championship drivers